A night letter is an unsigned leaflet distributed clandestinely.

Afghanistan

Night letters have been a tactic employed by the Taliban and other extremist groups in Afghanistan to intimidate supporters of secular government and education.

Iran

There is a history of shabnameh ("night letters") in Iran. Shabnameh were widely distributed in the 20th century in Iran over the course of several revolutionary movements.

Israel
In the late 1970s, Israeli peace activists belonging to the Shelly Party, a small left-wing party then holding two seats in the Knesset, distributed numerous such night letters in the postboxes of Tel Aviv houses. The leaflets contained eye-witness testimonies on severe human rights violations committed by IDF soldiers in the Occupied Territories, whose publication was forbidden by the military censorship. The leaflets were unsigned and at the time the party denied any connection with them. Only many years later did Uri Avnery, at the time Knesset member for Shelly, admit to having composed the leaflets and organised their distribution, stating that this act was justified since the censorship had abused its power to withhold information from the public.

See also
 Samizdat: a similar form of surreptitious dissident literature in the Soviet Union

References

External links
 http://www.thefreedictionary.com/night+letter
 http://www.merriam-webster.com/dictionary/night%20letter

Publications by format